Cryptocarya nova-anglica, the mountain laurel, is a rainforest tree growing in eastern Australia. The range of natural distribution is from the upper Hastings River to near the border of the state of Queensland. It is an understorey tree, associated with the Antarctic beech, possumwood, golden sassafras and black olive berry trees.

The specific epithet "nova-anglica" refers to the occurrence of this plant growing at New England National Park where it is most easily seen.

Description 

The base of the tree is not buttressed. The trunk is brown with some wrinkles and fissures. Small branches are fairly thick, orange or yellow and smooth. Buds covered in downy hairs.

Leaves are simple, alternate on the stem. Shiny dark green above, and dull grey below. The cream midrib is depressed above the leaf and raised below. Leaf veins are straight, not curved from the midrib.

Flowers, fruit & regeneration 

Small creamy green flowers form in the months of December to January.

Fruit matures in March to April, taking some fifteen months to mature. Fairly round or pear shaped. Like many Cryptocarya fruit, the seed can be ribbed, but not with all seeds with this species. Removal of the flesh should be undertaken before planting the seed.

References

External links

Trees of Australia
Flora of New South Wales
Laurales of Australia
nova-anglica
Taxa named by Bernard Hyland